Unlocked is the second studio album by the Japanese singer, model and actress Meisa Kuroki. It was released on February 15, 2012 in 3 different editions: 2 limited CD+DVD editions (Type A comes with Music videos and Making-of and Type B with the live concert "The Magazine Show") and a Regular edition. Limited editions comes with a 40-pages photobook.

Singles 
The album has three singles. The first single of the album is the song "One More Drama", released on April 13, 2011. The single reached #18 in Oricon's Weekly chart with a total of more than 5,000 copies sold.

The second single is the song "Wired Life", released on August 31, 2011. The single reached #12 in Oricon's Weekly chart and sold more than 15,000 copies. At the date, is her most successful single. The song was chosen as ending theme song for the anime Ao no Exorcist.

The third and last single is the double A-side "Woman's Worth / Breeze Out", released on December 7, 2011. It is the first double A-side single of Meisa Kuroki's singer career. It peaked #47 in Oricon's Weekly chart with around 3,000 copies sold. At the date, is her lowest selling single.

Track listing

Charts

Oricon

Other charts

Release history

Sources 

2012 albums
Japanese-language albums
Meisa Kuroki albums
Gr8! Records singles